The Sjöberg Prize is an award aimed at individuals or research groups that have made significant contributions to cancer research. The prize, which is international, is planned to be awarded annually. It consists of a 100,000 US dollars of free disposal and 900,000 dollars to fund future research making up a total of one million US dollars. The prize money increases to counteract inflation. The Prize is funded by The Sjöberg Foundation, and the Royal Swedish Academy of Sciences is responsible for deciding upon the Sjöberg Laureates. The Foundation was founded in 2016, and the first prize was announced on 14 February 2017.

Laureates

References

External links 
 The Sjöberg Foundation
The Royal Swedish Academy of Sciences

Awards established in 2017
Awards of the Royal Swedish Academy of Sciences
Cancer research awards